The women's 25 metre pistol competition at the 2014 Asian Games in Incheon, South Korea was held on 22 September at the Ongnyeon International Shooting Range.

Schedule
All times are Korea Standard Time (UTC+09:00)

Records

Results

Qualification

Semifinal

Finals

Bronze medal match

Gold medal match

References

ISSF Results Overview

External links
Official website

Women Pistol 25